The Etoro, or Edolo, are a tribe and ethnic group of Papua New Guinea. Their territory comprises the southern slopes of Mt. Sisa, along the southern edge of the central mountain range of New Guinea, near the Papuan Plateau.  They are well known among anthropologists because of ritual acts practiced between the young boys and men of the tribe. The Etoro believe that young males must ingest the semen of their elders to achieve adult male status and to properly mature and grow strong.

In 2009, the National Geographic Society reported an estimate that there were fewer than 1668 speakers of the Etoro/Edolo language.

Marriage
O'Neil and Kottak agree that most men marry and have heterosexual relations with their wives. The fear that heterosexual sex causes them to die earlier and the belief that homosexual sex prolongs life means that heterosexual relations are focused towards reproduction.

See also
Baruya people
Pedophilia
Rite of passage
Edolo language
Sambia people
Kaluli people
 LGBT rights in Papua New Guinea

References

 Knauft, Bruce M, What Ever Happened to Ritualized Homosexuality? Modern Sexual Subjects in Melanesia and Elsewhere, Annual Review of Sex Research,  2003. (Accessed Nov. 5, 2006)
 Kottak, Conrad Phillip. Cultural Anthropology, 12th Ed. New York: McGraw-Hill, 2008.
 O'Neil, Dennis, SEX AND MARRIAGE: An Introduction to The Cultural Rules Regulating Sexual Access and Marriage: Homosexuality,  Behavioral Sciences Department website, Palomar College, San Marcos, California (Accessed Mar. 21, 2021)
 Kelly, Raymond, Witchcraft and Sexual Relations, In P. Brown, and G. Buchbinder (eds.), Man and Woman in the New Guinea Highlands, 1976 (no electronic version available)

Ethnic groups in Papua New Guinea
Tribes of Oceania